The Shire of Cohuna was a local government area on the Murray River, about  north-northwest of Melbourne, the state capital of Victoria, Australia.

History

Cohuna was originally part of the Swan Hill Road District, which initially covered most of north-western Victoria. Swan Hill was incorporated on 8 July 1862, and became a shire on 14 August 1871. It was renamed the Shire of Kerang on 31 December 1898.

On 8 March 1922, parts of the North East and South East Ridings severed, and were incorporated as the Shire of Cohuna.

On 20 January 1995, the Shire of Cohuna was abolished, and along with the Borough of Kerang and the Shire of Kerang, was merged into the newly created Shire of Gannawarra.

Wards

The Shire of Cohuna was divided into three wards, each of which elected three councillors:
 Central Ward
 East Ward
 West Ward

Towns and localities
 Cohuna*
 Gannawarra
 Gunbower
 Leitchville
 Mead
 McMillans

* Council seat.

Population

* Estimate in the 1958 Victorian Year Book.

References

External links
 Victorian Places - Cohuna and Cohuna Shire

Cohuna
1922 establishments in Australia